Jennifer Gutiérrez (born September 14, 1986) is an American politician and community organizer currently serving as the Council Member for the 34th district in the New York City Council. The district includes portions of Bushwick, Greenpoint, and Williamsburg in Brooklyn and Ridgewood, Queens.

The Queens-born daughter of immigrants from Colombia, Gutiérrez is the first Colombian-American member of the New York City Council. She resides in Bushwick.

Early life and education 
Gutiérrez was born and raised in Queens. Her parents emigrated from Colombia in the 1980s. She grew up in a one-bedroom apartment in Queens with her mother, father and sister. She attended Jacqueline Kennedy Onassis High School, and later attended and graduated from SUNY Albany with a B.A. in Political Science.

Career 
Gutiérrez became involved in organizing working with the Arizona Democratic Party as a Field Organizer in 2012. In 2013, she joined the New York City Council Office of Diana Reyna as a Field Organizer.

Campaigns 
In 2013, Gutiérrez was the campaign manager for Antonio Reynoso's successful campaign for New York City Council. In 2016, she managed Nydia Velazquez's successful re-election bid for Congress.

New York City Council 
Gutiérrez served as the Chief of Staff to City Council Member Antonio Reynoso from 2014 until 2021, and led eight cycles of Participatory Budgeting, which resulted in over $5 million in investments in public spaces such as schools, streets, parks, and NYCHA. Gutiérrez played a leading role in passing the Right to Know Act, which brought transparency to police stops, as well as the Waste Equity Bill, which reduced the amount of trash trucks and the associated pollution in North Brooklyn.

Elected Office 
Gutiérrez won a primary election in June 2021 by a wide margin in a rank choice voting election and was elected to represent Council District 34 in November 2021. Gutiérrez is the first Colombian-American member of the New York City Council. She has been appointed chairperson of the Committee on Technology.

Personal life 
Gutiérrez and her husband have one child, born in November 2021. She lives in Bushwick, Brooklyn with her family.

References 

21st-century American politicians
Hispanic and Latino American New York City Council members
Hispanic and Latino American women in politics
University at Albany, SUNY alumni
Living people
New York (state) Democrats
New York City Council members
Politicians from Brooklyn
American politicians of Colombian descent
1986 births